Cuscuta umbellata, commonly known as flatglobe dodder, is a parasitic plant in the morning glory family (Convulvulaceae) found in the Sonoran Desert of the south-western United States. After summer monsoon rains, it spreads over the host plant in tangled masses of orange strings.

References

umbellata
Parasitic plants
Flora of the Sonoran Deserts